The Women's 4 × 100 m Medley Relay at the 2007 World Aquatics Championships took place on 31 March 2007 at the Rod Laver Arena in Melbourne, Australia. The top-12 finishers from this race qualified for the event at the 2008 Olympics. 29 teams were entered in the event; all swam.

The existing records when the event started were:
World Record (WR): 3:56.30, Australia (Edington, Jones, Schipper, Lenton), 21 March 2006 in Melbourne, Australia.
Championship Record (CR): 3:57.47, Australia (Edington, Jones, Schipper, Lenton), Montreal 2005 (Jul.30.2005)

Results

Finals

Preliminaries

See also
Swimming at the 2005 World Aquatics Championships – Women's 4 × 100 metre medley relay
Swimming at the 2008 Summer Olympics – Women's 4 × 100 metre medley relay
Swimming at the 2009 World Aquatics Championships – Women's 4 × 100 metre medley relay

References

Women's 4x100m Medley Relay Preliminary results from the 2007 World Championships. Published by OmegaTiming.com (official timer of the '07 Worlds); retrieved 2009-07-11.
Women's 4x100m Medley Relay Final results from the 2007 World Championships. Published by OmegaTiming.com (official timer of the '07 Worlds); retrieved 2009-07-11.

Swimming at the 2007 World Aquatics Championships
2007 in women's swimming